When She Starts, Look Out is a 1958 West German musical comedy film directed by Géza von Cziffra and starring Peter Alexander, Bibi Johns, and Ruth Stephan.

The film's sets were designed by the art director Emil Hasler and Paul Markwitz. It was shot at the Spandau Studios in Berlin and on location in Bavaria.

The plot was based on the Russian fim Jolly Fellows (1934), and that was this film's working title. The German title is a quote, line 163, from Schiller's poem Song of the Bell where it refers to nature's destructive forces ("Woe! when it, from bondage freed"), unrelated to the film's plot.

Cast

References

Bibliography

External links 
 

1958 films
1958 musical comedy films
German musical comedy films
West German films
1950s German-language films
Films directed by Géza von Cziffra
Constantin Film films
Films shot at Spandau Studios
1950s German films